HTS may refer to:

Military
 Helicopter Training School, of the Indian Air Force
 Human Terrain System, a U.S. military program
 Hay'at Tahrir al-Sham, a militant group involved in the Syrian Civil War

Places
 Holy Trinity School (Richmond Hill), Ontario, Canada
 Haibat Shahid railway station (station code HTS), in Pakistan
 Tri-State Airport (IATA airport code HTS), West Virginia, US
 The Heights (disambiguation) ("Heights" abbrev. as "Hts.")

Science and technology 
 High-temperature superconductivity
 High-throughput satellite
 High-throughput screening, drug discovery method
 DNA sequencing#High-throughput sequencing (HTS) methods

Other uses
 Hadza language (ISO 639 code hts), spoken in Tanzania
 HackThisSite, a website
 Harmonized Tariff Schedule of the United States
 HTS Teologiese Studies, formerly: Hervormde Teologiese Studies (HTS), a South African theological journal
 Home Team Sports, a former American sports network
 Horizontal tab set in the C1 control code set

See also

 
 HT (disambiguation)